Kip Yoshino Tokuda (October 8, 1946 – July 13, 2013) was an American social worker and politician.

Background
Tokuda was born in 1946 in Seattle, Washington. His parents George and Tamako (born Inouye) owned the Tokuda Pharmacy, which was located on Jackson Street at the time. He was raised in Seattle's Central District and on Beacon Hill neighborhoods. He initially attended Garfield High School, but transferred and graduated from Cleveland High School. Tokuda received both his bachelor's and master's degree from the University of Washington (1969, B.A. in sociology, master's degree in social work in 1973). He was director of children's and human services programs.

He served in the Washington House of Representatives 1995-2003 as a Democrat. Tokuda was chairman of the House Children and Family Services Committee of the state House. He was also a member of the Appropriations Committee and the Juvenile Justice and Family Law Committee in the chamber.

Tokuda founded the Japanese Cultural and Community Center of Washington. On April 29, 2012, Tokuda was awarded the Order of the Rising Sun, Gold Rays with Rosette by Emperor Akihito for promoting positive relations between Japan and the United States.

Death
Tokuda died of a heart attack on July 13, 2013 at age 66 while fishing on Whidbey Island.

See also
 History of the Japanese in Seattle

References

1946 births
2013 deaths
Democratic Party members of the Washington House of Representatives
Recipients of the Order of the Rising Sun, 4th class
American politicians of Japanese descent
Asian-American people in Washington (state) politics
University of Washington College of Arts and Sciences alumni
American social workers
University of Washington School of Social Work alumni